Crab curry (Caril de caranguejo in Portuguese) is a typical Indo-Portuguese dish from Goa, Daman and Diu, a region along the west coast of today's India which was part of the Portuguese State of India (Estado da Índia). It is also a typical dish from Mozambique, due to the significant population of Goan origin that exists in that country.

As the name implies, it is a curry dish prepared with crab, which traditionally has been found in abundance off the coast of Goa.

In addition to the crab, its ingredients include onion, tomato, piri piri (a cultivar of Capsicum chinense, one of the sources of chili pepper that grows both wild and domesticated), garlic, coconuts and spices which form a yellow curry.

The coconuts are grated, to extract its milk. The crab can be either cut into pieces or shredded. In the first case, it is common to be consumed by hand, to facilitate the extraction of meat. In both cases, the previously cooked crab is placed in a pan to boil with most of the ingredients. After some time the coconut milk is added, boiling the dish for about 30 minutes to rinse it.

It is usually served with white rice, which can be complemented with pickle and papads (paparis).

References

External links
Crab xacuti
 Goan Crab Curry Recipe, How to make Goan Crab Curry Recipe | Goan Curries
Goan crab curry
Goan Crab Masala Recipe (Goan Style Crab Curry) 
Desi Cuisine 133 Goan Crab Curry

Goan cuisine
Indian fusion cuisine
Portuguese fusion cuisine
Indian seafood dishes